The Zion Baptist Church in Marietta, Georgia is a Baptist church which was founded in 1866 by African American members of another Baptist church in the city. The current building, built in 1888, was added to the National Register of Historic Places in 1990.

History 
In 1865, African American members of First Baptist Church in Marietta, Georgia (many of whom had been slaves prior to the Civil War) petitioned the church for dismissal in order to form a black church under their own administration. This dismissal was granted the following year and Zion Baptist Church was officially founded on April 8, 1866, with Reverend Ephraim Rucker as the church's first pastor. The 88 original members of this congregation constructed a wooden church house on land donated by First Baptist. In 1888, this building was converted to a brick church building. This building would serve as the congregation's meeting house until 1978, when a new building was constructed across the street from this structure. As membership continued to grow, another building was constructed by the church in 2007. The 1888 building was added to the National Register of Historic Places on July 11, 1990. Today, tours are given of the restored building, which occasionally hosts weddings.

See also 
National Register of Historic Places listings in Cobb County, Georgia
The church invites all people from any background to join them.

References

Bibliography

External links 
 
 

Baptist churches in Georgia (U.S. state)
Buildings and structures completed in 1888
Churches on the National Register of Historic Places in Georgia (U.S. state)
National Register of Historic Places in Cobb County, Georgia
Buildings and structures in Marietta, Georgia